Nat Mor, real name Natasha Morris, is a British musician who was one of six winners of the BBC Usher Master Class.

Natasha sang "I Feel" that was produced by El-B and is available on Ministry of Sound UK Funky. She is also the co-founder and resident DJ on Ramp Radio.

References

External links
 "I Feel" Pitchfork Review 
 Ramp Radio

Living people
British women singers
Year of birth missing (living people)